Cacao is the seed from which cocoa and chocolate are made, from Spanish cacao, an adaptation of Nahuatl cacaua, the root form of cacahuatl ("bean of the cocoa-tree"). It may also refer to:

Plants
Theobroma cacao, a tropical evergreen tree
Cocoa bean, the seed from the tree used to make chocolate
Cacao paste, ground cacao beans. The mass is melted and separated into:
Cocoa butter, a pale, yellow, edible fat; and
Cocoa solids, the dark, bitter mass that contains most of cacao's notable phytochemicals, including caffeine and theobromine.

Places
Cacao, French Guiana
Cacao, Carolina, Puerto Rico
Cacao, Quebradillas, Puerto Rico
Cacao Alto, Patillas, Puerto Rico
Cacao Bajo, Patillas, Puerto Rico
Hacienda Cacao, Yucatán, Mexico

Other uses
Maria Cacao, a mountain goddess in the Philippines

See also
Cacau (disambiguation)
Cocoa (disambiguation)
Coca (disambiguation)
Kakao - a Korean messenger app company named after the cocoa or cacao seed